Stephen John Davies (born 2 January 1969 in Parkes, NSW) is an Australian hockey player who represented his country at three successive Summer Olympic Games, winning a silver medal and two bronze medals. In total he played for the Australia national hockey team 274 times over 10 years and was inducted into the Hockey NSW Hall of Fame in November 2009.

References

External links
 
 

1969 births
Living people
Australian male field hockey players
Olympic field hockey players of Australia
Field hockey players at the 1992 Summer Olympics
Field hockey players at the 1996 Summer Olympics
1998 Men's Hockey World Cup players
Field hockey players at the 2000 Summer Olympics
Sportsmen from New South Wales
Olympic silver medalists for Australia
Olympic bronze medalists for Australia
Olympic medalists in field hockey
Medalists at the 2000 Summer Olympics
Medalists at the 1996 Summer Olympics
Medalists at the 1992 Summer Olympics
Commonwealth Games medallists in field hockey
Commonwealth Games gold medallists for Australia
Field hockey players at the 1998 Commonwealth Games
1990 Men's Hockey World Cup players
20th-century Australian people
People from the Central West (New South Wales)
Field hockey people from New South Wales
Medallists at the 1998 Commonwealth Games